Yana Doroshenko (born Yana Azimova) is a Ukrainian-born Azerbaijani volleyball player that plays for Maccabi Hadera Hefer in Israeli Women's Volleyball League and Azerbaijan women's national volleyball team.

She competed at the 2018 Women's World Volleyball Championship, and 2021 Women's European Volleyball Championship.

Clubs
  Rabita Baku (2013-2015)
  Lokomotiv Baku (2015-2016)
  Telekom Baku (2016-2017)
  Absheron (2017-2018)
  Azerrail Baku (2018-2019)
  Mübariz SK (2019-2020)
  Maccabi Hadera (2020-2022)

References

External links
 
CEV profile
FIVB profile
 Volleybox profile
AZE W: Yana Azimova – a secret weapon of Azerbaijani national team

1994 births
Living people
Sportspeople from Chernihiv
Ukrainian women's volleyball players
Azerbaijani women's volleyball players
Ukrainian emigrants to Azerbaijan
Naturalized citizens of Azerbaijan
Setters (volleyball)